Amyloid protein-binding protein 2 is a protein that in humans is encoded by the APPBP2 gene.

The protein encoded by this gene interacts with microtubules and is functionally associated with beta-amyloid precursor protein transport and/or processing. The beta-amyloid precursor protein is a cell surface protein with signal-transducing properties, and it is thought to play a role in the pathogenesis of Alzheimer's disease. This gene has been found to be highly expressed in breast cancer. Multiple polyadenylation sites have been found for this gene.

Interactions
APPBP2 has been shown to interact with Amyloid precursor protein.{

References

External links

Further reading